Ryan James Jensen (born September 20, 1977) is an American mixed martial artist who competed in the Middleweight division. A professional competitor from 1997 until 2015, he competed for the UFC, Bellator, and Strikeforce.

Mixed martial arts career

Background
Jensen began training at the age of 15, under UFC 3 winner Steve Jennum. Following his first fight against Travis Fulton in February 1997, he did not compete again until June 2002. Jensen quit his day job in November 2006, and since then has been training and fighting full-time.

Ultimate Fighting Championship
His UFC debut was on August 25, 2007 at UFC 74; his initial opponent was supposed be Travis Lutter, however Lutter was forced to withdraw due to injury. Instead, Jensen faced late replacement Thales Leites and after a strong start, got caught by an armbar submission in the first round. He followed this up with another loss to Demian Maia before leaving the UFC.

On March 29, 2008, Jensen accepted a fight against Joey Villasenor on four days notice in the Strikeforce promotion. Again, after a strong start, Jensen lost by KO with 15 seconds remaining in the first round at Strikeforce: Shamrock vs. Le.

Since then, Jensen rebounded with a first round TKO over Mitch Whitesel at SportFight 23 in June 2008, as well as a first round submission victory over Aaron Praschack due to strikes in VFC 23.

Jensen then returned to the UFC and was defeated by Wilson Gouveia at UFC Fight Night: Diaz vs Neer via submission (armbar).

This was followed up by a win over Steve Steinbeiss at UFC Fight Night: Diaz vs. Guillard via first round technical submission.

Jensen faced Mark Muñoz at UFC 108 on January 2, 2010. He lost the fight via submission (punches) at the 2:30 mark of the first round.

Jensen faced Jesse Forbes  at UFC 114 on May 29, 2010. He defeated Forbes by guillotine choke submission in the first round.

Jensen fought Court McGee at UFC 121. He lost the fight via arm triangle choke in the third round.

Jensen was defeated by Jason MacDonald via first round submission at UFC 129 and was subsequently released from the promotion.

Post-UFC
One year after his UFC release, Jensen returned to MMA and faced Jason Louck at Disorderly Conduct: Warriors on May 19, 2012. He won the fight via a guillotine choke submission.

He then faced Rudy Bears in the main event of Victory Fighting Championship 39 on March 30, 2013. Jensen won the fight via first round TKO.

Jensen faced Victor Moreno at Victory Fighting Championship 40 on July 27, 2013. He won the fight via guillotine choke submission.

Jensen then faced Ryan McClain at Victory Fighting Championship 42 on March 15, 2014. He won the fight via first round TKO.

Bellator MMA
After compiling a 4-0 record on the regional MMA circuit, Jensen made his Bellator MMA debut on April 18, 2014 at Bellator 117. He defeated Mark Stoddard by submission in the first round.

Personal life
Jensen and his wife have two daughters.

Championships and accomplishments
Ultimate Fighting Championship
Submission of the Night (One time) vs. Jesse Forbes

Mixed martial arts record

|-
| Win
|align=center| 21–8
|Matt Jones
|TKO (punches)
|VFC 45
|
|align=center|1
|align=center|3:57
|Ralston, Nebraska, United States
|Catchweight (180 lbs) bout.
|-
| Win
|align=center| 20–8
|Mark Stoddard
|Submission (arm-triangle choke)
|Bellator 117
|
|align=center|1
|align=center|3:52
|Council Bluffs, Iowa, United States
|Catchweight (175 lbs) bout.
|-
| Win
|align=center| 19–8
| Ryan McClain
| TKO (punches)
| VFC 42
| 
|align=center| 1
|align=center| 1:19
|Omaha, Nebraska, United States
|
|-
| Win
|align=center| 18–8
| Victor Moreno
| Submission (guillotine choke)
| VFC 40
| 
|align=center| 1
|align=center| 3:12
|Omaha, Nebraska, United States
|
|-
| Win
|align=center| 17–8
| Rudy Bears
| TKO (punches)
| VFC 39
| 
|align=center| 1
|align=center| 1:01
|Omaha, Nebraska, United States
|
|-
| Win
|align=center| 16–8
| Jason Louck
| Submission (guillotine choke)
| Disorderly Conduct: Warriors
| 
|align=center| 1
|align=center| 4:28
|Omaha, Nebraska, United States
| 
|-
| Loss
|align=center| 15–8
| Jason MacDonald
| Submission (triangle choke)
| UFC 129
| 
|align=center| 1
|align=center| 1:37
|Toronto, Ontario, Canada
| 
|-
| Loss
|align=center| 15–7
| Court McGee
| Submission (arm-triangle choke)
| UFC 121
| 
|align=center| 3
|align=center| 1:21
|Anaheim, California, United States
| 
|-
| Win
|align=center| 15–6
| Jesse Forbes
| Submission (guillotine choke)
| UFC 114
| 
|align=center| 1
|align=center| 1:06
|Las Vegas, Nevada, United States
| 
|-
| Loss
|align=center| 14–6
| Mark Muñoz
| Submission (punches)
| UFC 108
| 
|align=center| 1
|align=center| 2:30
|Las Vegas, Nevada, United States
| 
|-
| Win
|align=center| 14–5
| Steve Steinbeiss
| Technical submission (guillotine choke)
| UFC Fight Night: Diaz vs. Guillard
| 
|align=center| 1
|align=center| 3:56
|Oklahoma City, Oklahoma, United States
| 
|-
| Loss
|align=center| 13–5
| Wilson Gouveia
| Submission (armbar)
| UFC Fight Night: Diaz vs Neer
| 
|align=center| 2
|align=center| 2:04
|Omaha, Nebraska, United States
| 
|-
| Win
|align=center| 13–4
| Aaron Praschak
| TKO (punches)
| Victory Fighting Championships 24
| 
|align=center| 1
|align=center| 2:09
|Council Bluffs, Iowa, United States
| 
|-
| Win
|align=center| 12–4
| Mitch Whitesel
| TKO (punches)
| SportFight 23
| 
|align=center| 1
|align=center| 4:42
|Portland, Oregon, United States
| 
|-
| Loss
|align=center| 11–4
| Joey Villaseñor
| KO (punch)
| Strikeforce: Shamrock vs. Le
| 
|align=center| 1
|align=center| 4:45
|San Jose, California, United States
| 
|-
| Loss
|align=center| 11–3
| Demian Maia
| Submission (rear-naked choke)
| UFC 77
| 
|align=center| 1
|align=center| 2:40
|Cincinnati, Ohio, United States
| 
|-
| Loss
|align=center| 11–2
| Thales Leites
| Submission (armbar)
| UFC 74
| 
|align=center| 1
|align=center| 3:47
|Las Vegas, Nevada, United States
| 
|-
| Win
|align=center| 11–1
| Curtis Stout
| Submission (triangle choke)
| VFC 19: Inferno
| 
|align=center| 1
|align=center| 3:10
|Council Bluffs, Iowa, United States
| 
|-
| Win
|align=center| 10–1
| Alfred Escobedo
| Submission (punches)
| IFC: Road to Global Domination
| 
|align=center| 1
|align=center| 1:21
|Belton, Texas, United States
| 
|-
| Win
|align=center| 9–1
| BJ Lacy
| TKO (punches)
| IFC: Rumble on the River 2
| 
|align=center| 1
|align=center| 2:34
|Kearney, Nebraska, United States
| 
|-
| Win
|align=center| 8–1
| Rob Kimmons
| Submission (choke)
| VFC 14: Aggression
| 
|align=center| 1
|align=center| N/A
|Council Bluffs, Iowa, United States
| 
|-
| Win
|align=center| 7–1
| Marlon Sims
| Submission (rear-naked choke)
| IFC: Caged Combat
| 
|align=center| 1
|align=center| 1:51
|Sacramento, California, United States
| 
|-
| Win
|align=center| 6–1
| Danny Anderson
| TKO (punches)
| VFC 10: Championship X
| 
|align=center| 2
|align=center| 1:16
|Council Bluffs, Iowa, United States
| 
|-
| Loss
|align=center| 5–1
| Brock Larson
| TKO (submission to punches)
| Extreme Challenge 63
| 
|align=center| 1
|align=center| 1:39
|Hayward, Wisconsin, United States
| 
|-
| Win
|align=center| 5–0
| Neal Rowe
| Submission (rear-naked choke)
| Extreme Challenge 63
| 
|align=center| 1
|align=center| 2:00
|Hayward, Wisconsin, United States
| 
|-
| Win
|align=center| 4–0
| Tyrone Roberts
| Submission (triangle choke)
| Victory Fighting Championships 5
| 
|align=center| 1
|align=center| 2:46
|Council Bluffs, Iowa, United States
| 
|-
| Win
|align=center| 3–0
|  Josh Stamp
| TKO (punches)
| VFC 2: Bragging Rights
| 
|align=center| 1
|align=center| 0:56
|Council Bluffs, Iowa, United States
| 
|-
| Win
|align=center| 2–0
|  Brian Robinson
| TKO (submission to punches)
| Victory Fighting Championships 1
| 
|align=center| 1
|align=center| 0:20
|Council Bluffs, Iowa, United States
| 
|-
| Win
|align=center| 1–0
| Travis Fulton
| Submission (triangle choke)
| Extreme Challenge 4
| 
|align=center| 1
|align=center| 1:40
|Council Bluffs, Iowa, United States
|

See also
 List of current UFC fighters
 List of male mixed martial artists

References

External links
 
 

American male mixed martial artists
Mixed martial artists from Nebraska
Middleweight mixed martial artists
Living people
1977 births
Sportspeople from Omaha, Nebraska
Ultimate Fighting Championship male fighters